Jake Trotter is a football writer for ESPN primarily focused on the Cleveland Browns and formerly the Big 12 Conference. He previously worked at The Oklahoman, Austin American-Statesman and Middletown Journal. Sources: Dallas Morning News, WIBW-TV in Topeka, Kansas, WVOC 560 The Team AM Sports Radio in Columbia, South Carolina, KFOR-TV in Oklahoma City, and The Cincinnati Enquirer.

Books

References

External links
 Jake Trotter at ESPN

American sports journalists